Hackney North was a parliamentary constituency in "The Metropolis" (later the  County of London). It returned one Member of Parliament (MP)  to the House of Commons of the Parliament of the United Kingdom.

History
Elections have been held here since Simon de Montfort's Parliament in 1265 for the county constituency of Middlesex.

Under the Great Reform Act of 1832 and from then onward, Hackney formed part of the new Parliamentary Borough of Tower Hamlets. This much larger area than today's borough with that name was only divided with the creation of the two seat constituency of Hackney at the 1868 general election, comprising the large parishes of Bethnal Green and Shoreditch. This was a creation of the Second Reform Act or the officially termed Representation of the People Act, 1867. Hackney's increased democratic representation provided suffrage for the first time to working-class men but was originally intended to increase the number of seats held in the House of Commons by the Conservative Party.

The constituency was created under the Redistribution of Seats Act, 1885 when the two-member Parliamentary Borough of Hackney was split into three single-member divisions. The seat, officially the Northern Division of the Parliamentary Borough of Hackney was first contested at the 1885 general election. The constituency was abolished under the Representation of the People Act, 1948 for the 1950 general election, when it was largely replaced by the new Hackney North and Stoke Newington constituency.

Boundaries

1885–1918
In 1885 the constituency was defined as consisting of:
The Parish of Stoke Newington (previously part of the Parliamentary Borough of Finsbury)
No. 1 or Stamford Hill Ward of Hackney Parish
No. 2 or West Hackney Ward of Hackney Parish
The part of No. 5 or Hackney Ward of Hackney Parish north of the centres of Evering Road, Upper Clapton Road, and Southwold Road.

1918–1950
The Representation of the People Act 1918 redrew constituencies throughout Great Britain and Ireland. Seats in the County of London were redefined in terms of wards of the Metropolitan Boroughs that had been created in 1900. The Metropolitan Borough of Hackney was divided into three divisions, with the same names as the constituencies created in 1885. Hackney North was defined as consisting of :
Stamford Hill Ward
The part of Clapton Park Ward to the north of a line drawn along the centres of Glenarm Road, Glyn Road and Redwald Road to its junction with Maclaren Street, thence across the recreation grounds in Daubeney Road to the borough boundary at a point fifty feet north of a boundary post situate at the junction of the Waterworks River with the River Lea at Lead Mill Point.
The part of West Hackney Ward to the north and west of the centre of Shacklewell Lane.

Stoke Newington was removed from the seat, and became a separate constituency.

Redistribution
The constituency was abolished by the Representation of the People Act 1948. The Borough of Hackney and Stoke Newington jointly formed two seats, Stoke Newington and Hackney North and Hackney South.  The bulk of Hackney North passed to the Stoke Newington and Hackney North seat.

Members of Parliament

Elections

Elections in the 1880s

Elections in the 1890s

Elections in the 1900s

Elections in the 1910s

Elections in the 1920s

Elections in the 1930s

Elections in the 1940s

References

Parliamentary constituencies in London (historic)
Constituencies of the Parliament of the United Kingdom established in 1885
Constituencies of the Parliament of the United Kingdom disestablished in 1950
Parliamentary constituencies in the London Borough of Hackney